The Sanctuary of Bom Jesus do Monte is a Portuguese Catholic shrine in Tenões, outside the city of Braga, in northern Portugal. Its name means Good Jesus of the Mount.

This sanctuary is a notable example of Christian pilgrimage site with a monumental, Baroque stairway that climbs 116 meters (381 feet). It is an important tourist attraction of Braga.

On 7 July 2019, the Sanctuary of Bom Jesus do Monte in Braga was inscribed as a UNESCO World Heritage Site.

History
Many hilltops in Portugal and other parts of Europe have been sites of religious devotion since antiquity, and it is possible that the Bom Jesus hill was one of these. However, the first indication of a chapel over the hill dates from 1373. This chapel - dedicated to the Holy Cross - was rebuilt in the 15th and 16th centuries. In 1629 a pilgrimage church was built dedicated to the Bom Jesus (Good Jesus), with six chapels dedicated to the Passion of Christ.

The present Sanctuary started being built in 1722, under the patronage of the Archbishop of Braga, Rodrigo de Moura Telles. His coat of arms is seen over the gateway, in the beginning of the stairway. Under his direction the first stairway row, with chapels dedicated to the Via Crucis, were completed. Each chapel is decorated with terra cotta sculptures depicting the Passion of Christ. He also sponsored the next segment of stairways, which has a zigzag shape and is dedicated to the Five Senses. Each sense (Sight, Smell, Hearing, Touch, Taste) is represented by a different fountain. At the end of this stairway, a Baroque church was built around 1725 by architect Manuel Pinto Vilalobos.

The works on the first chapels, stairways and church proceeded through the 18th century. In an area behind the church (the Terreiro dos Evangelistas), three octagonal chapels were built in the 1760s with statues depicting episodes that occur after the Crucifixion, like the meeting of Jesus with Mary Magdalene. The exterior design of the beautiful chapels is attributed to renowned Braga architect André Soares. Around these chapels there are four Baroque fountains with statues of the Evangelists, also dating from the 1760s.

Around 1781, archbishop Gaspar de Bragança decided to complete the ensemble by adding a third segment of stairways and a new church. The third stairway also follows a zigzag pattern and is dedicated to the Three Theological Virtues: Faith, Hope and Charity, each with its fountain. The old church was demolished and a new one was built following a Neoclassic design by architect Carlos Amarante. This new church, began in 1784, had its interior decorated in the beginning of the 19th century and was consecrated in 1834. The main altarpiece is dedicated to the Crucifixion.

In the 19th century, the area around the church and stairway was expropriated and turned into a park. In 1882, to facilitate the access to the Sanctuary, the water balance Bom Jesus funicular was built linking the city of Braga to the hill. This was the first funicular to be built in the Iberian Peninsula and is still in use.

The Sanctuary has been classified as Property of Public Interest since 1970.

Significance

The design of the Sanctuary of Bom Jesus, with its Baroque nature emphasised by the zigzag form of its stairways, influenced many other sites in Portugal (like Lamego) and colonial Brazil, like the Sanctuary of Congonhas. As the pilgrims climbed the stairs, (by tradition encouraged to do so on their knees) they encountered a theological programme that contrasted the senses of the material world with the virtues of the spirit, at the same time as they experienced the scenes of the Passion of Christ. The culmination of the effort was the temple of God, the church on the top of the hill. The presence of several fountains along the stairways give the idea of purification of the faithful.

The new church (built 1784–1834) by Carlos Amarante was one of the first Neoclassic churches of Portugal.

This church was elevated to a Minor Basilica status on 5 July 2015 by Pope Francis.

See also
 Sanctuary of Our Lady of Sameiro
 Sacri Monti of Piedmont and Lombardy

References

Portuguese Institute for Architectural Heritage
General Bureau for National Buildings and Monuments (Portugal)
Basilica of Bom Jesus, Old Goa The Shrine of Saint Francis Xavier
“Bom Jesus de Braga” seeking World Heritage status – Portugal The sanctuary of Bom Jesus do Monte, in Braga city, mainland Portugal, is seeking UNESCO’s World Heritage status as part of its 200th anniversary celebrations, reported Lusa news agency.

External links 
 
 Santuário do Bom Jesus do Monte - Patrimonio Cultural

Roman Catholic churches completed in 1834
Baroque architecture in Portugal
Roman Catholic churches in Braga
Basilica churches in Portugal
World Heritage Sites in Portugal
19th-century Roman Catholic church buildings in Portugal